Daimar Liiv (born 18 August 1966 Tallinn) is an Estonian politician. He was a member of VII Riigikogu.

References

Living people
1966 births
Members of the Riigikogu, 1992–1995
Members of the Riigikogu, 1995–1999
Politicians from Tallinn